Medical Center is a Washington Metro station in Bethesda, Maryland, United States. The island-platformed station was opened on August 25, 1984, and is operated by the Washington Metropolitan Area Transit Authority (WMATA). Providing service for the Red Line, the station serves the National Institutes of Health campus and the Walter Reed National Military Medical Center, and is located at Rockville Pike and South Drive. Since there is little retail in the area and no commuter parking lot, this station is used almost exclusively by employees and visitors to those two institutions.

History
The station opened on August 25, 1984.

In September 2009, Montgomery County submitted a $20 million federal grant application to build a pedestrian tunnel under Rockville Pike to improve access to the Medical Center stop from Walter Reed Medical Center.  Currently, there is only a crosswalk here, with many passengers crossing the heavily travelled street from Walter Reed on the east side of MD 355 to get to the station on the west side. Construction would have originally occurred in 2011, but the project was not approved until 2013. The project is fully funded at $68 million, mostly through the Department of Defense, and includes installation of new deep elevators, improvement of surface bicycle and pedestrian facilities, as well as an extension of the left turn lane on southbound MD 355. The project began construction in 2017. The elevators and staircases of the MD 355 crossing underpass opened in late 2021 and the east side elevators to mezzanine, another elevator to platform, and a new staircase are opened on February 25, 2022.

Station layout 
Medical Center is the last underground station heading towards , as north of this station, it emerges out of the tunnel onto a brief elevated section, crossing the Capital Beltway. 
The station is one of 11 stations in the system constructed with rock tunneling and is accordingly deeper underground than most stations in the system.

Unlike most other Red Line stations, the escalator bank emerges above ground outside, rather than in a subterranean landing. These escalators are located at the southwest corner of Rockville Pike and South Drive, where bus bays and a kiss and ride lot are also located.

References

External links
 

 The Schumin Web Transit Center: Medical Center Station
 NIH Gateway Center construction map: 
 South Drive entrance from Google Maps Street View

Buildings and structures in Bethesda, Maryland
Railway stations in Montgomery County, Maryland
Railway stations located underground in Maryland
Stations on the Red Line (Washington Metro)
Washington Metro stations in Maryland
Railway stations in the United States opened in 1984
1984 establishments in Maryland